Dave's Killer Bread is an American brand of organic whole-grain products. Flowers Foods purchased the brand in 2015 for $275 million.

The brand was founded in 2005 in Milwaukie, Oregon by Dave Dahl, who learned the baking trade growing up in his family bakery. The company expanded from 30 employees to more than 190 by 2010 and to 280 by the end of 2012. The company specialized in breads made with seeds and whole grains, including spelt and sprouted wheat and free of animal products and chemical additives. Dahl reportedly received $33 million in the sale to Flower Foods in 2015. Under Flowers Foods the brand has become the  largest organic bread company in North America.

References 

Companies based in Milwaukie, Oregon
Brand name breads
Bakeries of the United States